Santiago Giraldo was the defending champion but chose not to defend his title.

Mackenzie McDonald won the title after defeating Bradley Klahn 6–4, 6–2 in the final.

Seeds

Draw

Finals

Top half

Bottom half

References
Main Draw
Qualifying Draw

Fairfield Challenger - Singles
Fairfield Challenger